Augie Blunt (August 17, 1929 – May 2, 1999) was an American film and television actor.

Blunt was born Augustine Durell Blunt in Monroe, Michigan, located south of Detroit, Michigan; his parents were William Blunt and Essie C. Wilson-Blunt. He and his parents lived  Monroe. After the military Augie moved to Los Angeles, California where he was a musician and a teacher for LAUSD before deciding to become an actor, and so he did by appearing in films and television shows. His son Erin Blunt was a child actor in Car Wash and Bad News Bears.

Blunt married Dolores Scott on February 2, 1962, in Las Vegas, Nevada, together they had 3 children, (1 son, 2 daughters), Jean Adele Scott- Blunt (b. 1958), Carla Nicole Scott- Blunt (b. 1960), Erin Durell Blunt (b. 1963)

Augie died on May 2, 1999, in Los Angeles, California, he was 69 years old at the time of his death, and was interred at Riverside National Cemetery.

Filmography

References

External links
 
 Augie Blunt at Find a Grave

1929 births
1999 deaths
American male film actors
American male television actors
Burials at Riverside National Cemetery
Male actors from Michigan
People from Monroe, Michigan
20th-century American male actors